LA GRANDEE International College (formerly known as Pokhara College of Technology, or PCT) was established in 2000 as Pokhara's first College for BCA program. Now, the college runs the other programs like BBA and BPH along with BCA.

Location

LA GRANDEE International College is located in Pokhara city of Kaski district.

Teaching
LA GRANDEE International College is a Pokhara University affiliated college. It uses a semester system. All bachelor's degrees are of four years (delivered over eight semesters).

There are four programs:

 Bachelor of Computer Application (BCA)
 Bachelor of Business Administration (BBA)
 Bachelor of Public Health (BPH)
 Post Graduate Diploma in Computer Application (PGDCA)

References

External links

Universities and colleges in Nepal
Education in Pokhara
2000 establishments in Nepal